Stachnik is a Polish-language surname. Originally it was a given name derived from the name Stanislaw, diminutive: Stach.  Notable people with the surname include:
Sebastian Stachnik (born 1986), German footballer
Walter Stachnik, Inspector General of the U.S. Securities and Exchange Commission

References

Polish-language surnames